Dietrich II may refer to:

 Dietrich II, Margrave of Lower Lusatia (c. 989 – 1034)
 Dietrich II, Count of Cleves (ruled 1147–1172)
 Theodoric II of Isenburg-Kempenich (ruled until 1232 or later)
 Dietrich II of Isenberg-Limburg (died c. 1303)